Alfred Grace (10 March 1866 – 16 September 1929) was an English cricketer. He played for Gloucestershire between 1886 and 1891.

References

1866 births
1929 deaths
English cricketers
Gloucestershire cricketers
People from Chipping Sodbury
Sportspeople from Gloucestershire
W. G. Grace
Alfred